The Smith College School for Social Work is a professional school within Smith College that provides graduate social work education to students around the world. In its history, the school has educated approximately 7000 clinical social workers, including Bertha Capen Reynolds, Florence Hollis, and Lydia Rapoport, The school is ranked 16th in the U.S. News & World Report ranking of graduate programs in social work.

History 

Smith College School for Social Work originated from an emergency course given in the Summer of 1918-1919 to prepare social workers for service in military hospitals treating soldiers with "shell shock" returning from the First World War. Civilian psychiatric hospitals were already using social workers to assist physicians in obtaining patients’ social histories, considered a necessary ingredient for sound diagnosis, and to aid the patients in their "social adjustment" back to their communities after release from care. The Smith College course was the first formal training program for social workers to become trained as "psychiatric social workers", specializing in social psychiatry.

The program was created by E. E. Southard, director of the Boston Psychopathic Hospital, who was planning an emergency training course at the hospital, and Smith College president William Allan Nielson, who was looking for ways to use College facilities and equipment to aid in the war effort. With financial support from the Permanent Charity Fund of Boston and the National Committee for Mental Hygiene, which Southard headed, the training course began in July 1918 with sixty-three students.

The course became a permanent program in 1919. F. Stuart Chapin, Smith College professor of sociology, was appointed the first director, with Mary C. Jarrett, chief of social services at Boston Psychopathic Hospital and one of the founders of the emergency trainings held in 1918, appointed as the associate director. The newly established Smith College Training School for Social Work had four training courses: medical social work, psychiatric social work, community service, and an advanced course in child welfare for individuals already engaged in social work with children. Classes in psychology and sociology were required of all students. The eight-week didactic program was held on Smith College campus with clinical demonstrations taking place in the Northampton State Hospital for the Insane. Students then went on to six months of practical training in hospitals and social agencies in Boston, Philadelphia, New York, and Baltimore. They returned to Smith College for a second eight-week didactic program the following summer.

Following the success of Smith's initial emergency training course, several schools, including University of Pennsylvania School of Social Work, The New York School of Social Work (now Columbia), University of Chicago, and Johns Hopkins University instituted psychiatric social work training programs. The American Association of Psychiatric Social Workers (AAPSW) was established in 1921, and was absorbed into the National Association of Social Work in 1955, along with the other major social work associations.

The school today 

While the term "psychiatric social work" has since been replaced in the social work lexicon with "clinical social work", the SCSSW continues to train social workers specializing in the provision of mental health-focused practice. Unlike the majority of schools of social work in the US, which have adopted a generalist paradigm that aims to introduce students to a wide range of social work settings and modalities, the SCSSW has retained its single focus on clinical social work,

Program structure

The block structure of the program is in a longer form than its original design. The current Masters in Social Work program lasts 27 months.  A ten-week didactic session of coursework held during summer months is followed by an eight-month, 30-hours-per-week field internship, followed by another ten-week didactic session held in the summer, followed by a second eight-month, 30-hours-per-week field internship. Students return for a third and final ten-week didactic summer session before graduation. The curriculum divides courses into four areas: social work practice; human behavior in the social environment; social welfare policy and services; and research.

The Smith SSW field internships place students in a social service agency for 30 hours per week (including two hours of individual supervision each week). More than 120 agencies in 20 states and Canada participate in Smith's field program. Internship sites include schools, family service and child welfare agencies, child guidance and mental health clinics, medical as well as psychiatric units of hospitals and college counseling centers.

Doctoral students are required to complete two nine-month clinical internships in addition to program of coursework and research. Similar to the master's program, the doctoral curriculum operates on a block plan of instruction in which periods of classroom study alternate with periods of clinical and research study in the field. Academic courses are taken at Smith College between June and August.

The two eight-month clinical internship periods (September through April) take place after the first and second summers of on-campus study. A Clinical Qualifying Examination, taken at the end of the first year field internship, and a Comprehensive Examination, taken during the second field internship, precede the dissertation, an independent scholarly research project that examines a topic relevant to clinical social work.

In addition to the masters and doctoral degree programs, the school currently offers several certificate programs including advanced clinical supervision and palliative clinical care.

Anti-racism 

When Ann Hartman became dean in 1986, there were few students of color in the student body. Seeking to solicit support for increasing the enrollment of students of color, the school sponsored the Minority Alumni Conference on campus in the summer of 1987, to which all the school's alumni of color were invited. This three-day conference convened with widespread participation from across the United States and Canada. By the end of the conference, a list of 33 proposals had been generated. These proposals included the recruitment and retention of a more diverse support staff; the inclusion of diversity content throughout the curriculum; greater attention to "required" diversity content in the field curriculum; and the recruitment and retention of agencies and supervisors.

Following the conference, the school obtained funding and grant support to help increase the enrollment of students of color and hired a full-time director of admissions with a clear mandate concerning the recruitment of a diverse student body. The school also sought to increase the diversity among the school's support staff and summer teaching faculty. The role of the Marta Sotomayor Senior Fellow (previously known as the Bertha Reynolds Senior Fellow) was created for senior adjunct teaching faculty who live in residence during the summer to assist in a variety of ways.

The school adopted a formal commitment to institute a series of structures towards its goal of becoming an anti-racism institution. Notable among these were:

Monthly meetings of resident faculty and senior administrators initiated in 1991
Anti-Racism Task Force formed in 1994, including campus-wide activities, exhibits, awareness-raising, and coalition building. The task force is open to all members of the Smith community and works with other organizations on campus.
Anti-Racism Consultation Committee (ARCC) was formed in 1995 to consult around issues of race, ethnicity, culture, and social justice. The ARCC may make recommendations to the dean about policy and programmatic changes to further the anti-racism commitment. The ARCC is also charged with assessing the SSW's progress towards becoming an anti-racism institution and issues a progress report every two years.

In 2016, two letters that were sent to top administrators that were perceived as racist were leaked. One was signed by "concerned adjuncts," while the other was written by Dennis Miehls.

The Smith College Studies in Social Work 

The Smith College Studies in Social Work, an in-house scholarly journal featuring articles on topics of relevance to clinical social work was inaugurated in 1930 and remains in publication today.

Notable alumni 
Bertha Capen Reynolds, AB 1908, MSS 1919
Lydia Rapoport
Caitlin Ryan (social worker), MSW 1982

References 

Schools of social work in the United States
Smith College